Chromolaena trigonocarpa  is a rare Caribbean species of flowering shrub in the family Asteraceae. It is found only the Island of Dominica in the Lesser Antilles.

Chromolaena trigonocarpa is a branching shrub or subshrub with curved hairs on the stem. It has opposite leaves with teeth and a pointed tip. Flower heads are displayed in a flat-topped array.

References

External links
photo of herbarium specimen at Missouri Botanical Garden, collected in Dominica, type specimen of Eupatorium trigonocarpum/Chromolaena trigonocarpa

trigonocarpa
Flora of Dominica
Plants described in 1861